is a railway station in Takanabe, Miyazaki, Japan.

Lines

Layout 
The station consists of an island platform serving two tracks at grade with a passing loop and siding branching off track 2. The station building is a wooden structure in traditional Japanese style with a tiled roof. It houses a staffed ticket window, a waiting area, an automatic ticket vending machine and a shop selling local produce. Access to the island platform is by means of a covered footbridge.

Management of the passenger facilities at the station has been outsourced to the JR Kyushu Tetsudou Eigyou Co., a wholly owned subsidiary of JR Kyushu specialising in station services. It staffs the ticket booth which is equipped with a Midori no Madoguchi facility.

Adjacent stations

History
In 1913, the  had opened a line from  northwards to Hirose (now closed). After the Miyazaki Prefectural Railway was nationalized on 21 September 1917, Japanese Government Railways (JGR) undertook the subsequent extension of the track as part of the then Miyazaki Main Line. In the first phase of expansion, the track from Jirogabyū (now  forked off from the track to Hirose and extended north, with Takanabe which opened on 11 September 1920 as the new northern terminus. Expanding north in phases and joining up with other networks, the track eventually reached  and the entire stretch from Kokura through Takanabe to Miyakonojō was redesignated as the Nippō Main Line on 15 December 1923. With the privatization of Japanese National Railways (JNR), the successor of JGR, on 1 April 1987, the station came under the control of JR Kyushu.

Passenger statistics
In fiscal 2016, the station was used by an average of 799 passengers daily (boarding passengers only), and it ranked 192nd among the busiest stations of JR Kyushu.

See also
List of railway stations in Japan

References

External links
Takanabe (JR Kyushu)

Railway stations in Miyazaki Prefecture
Railway stations in Japan opened in 1920